Judith Glory Hill is an American singer-songwriter from Los Angeles, California. She has provided backing vocals for such artists as Michael Jackson, Prince, and Josh Groban. In 2009, Hill was chosen as Jackson's duet partner for the song "I Just Can't Stop Loving You" during his This Is It concerts. After Jackson's death in 2009, she, along with the rest of the This Is It cast members, performed at Jackson's memorial service and attracted global attention when she sang the lead on the song "Heal the World". Hill's rise to fame is recounted in 20 Feet from Stardom, a documentary film that tells the untold story of the backup singers behind some of the "greatest musical legends of the 21st century". She is also a featured artist on the film's soundtrack. She won the Grammy Award for Best Music Film for her performance in this film.

A number of Hill's original ballads, including "Desperation" were featured in the 2012 Spike Lee film Red Hook Summer.  In March 2013, Hill became a contestant during the fourth season of The Voice. Hill opened for Josh Groban during the third leg of his All That Echoes World Tour (North America) in Fall 2013.  She also performed two duets with him in his set for "The Prayer" and "Remember When It Rained", the latter of which was released as a single.  She also toured with John Legend on the UK leg of his #AllOfMe tour in the Fall of 2014.

Her debut album Back in Time, recorded at Paisley Park with Prince as co-producer, was officially released as a free download on Judith Hill's WeTransfer account on March 23 and made available until March 25, 2015, via a Livenation email with a note from Prince.

Life and career
Hill's mother Michiko Hill (née Yoshimura) is a pianist from Tokyo who met Hill's father Robert Lee "Pee Wee" Hill in a funk group in the 1970s. Judith's mother is Japanese and her father is African-American. She can speak and sing in both English and Japanese and is also fluent in French and Spanish.

After a degree in music composition from Biola University, Hill went to France in 2007 to perform with the French singer Michel Polnareff. She began a career as a singer-songwriter when she returned to the United States.

According to Tom Meek of LA Weekly, Hill's voice is distinctive, soulful and has an earthy quality that makes it unique. She moves easily from R&B to funk to hip-hop to jazz to gospel.

Hill is credited for singing backing vocals and/or choir for Gregg Allman (Low Country Blues); Anastacia (Freak of Nature); Patrizio Buanne (Patrizio); Andraé Crouch (The Journey); Harold Faltermeyer (Copout); Josh Groban (All That Echoes); Taylor Hicks (Taylor Hicks); Carole King (A Holiday Carole); Evelyn "Champagne" King (Open Book); Mike Oldfield (Man on the Rocks); Barry Manilow (15 Minutes); Dave Stewart (The Ringmaster General and The Blackbird Diaries); Rod Stewart (Soulbook); Robbie Williams (Intensive Care); Incubus (Trust Fall (Side A), song "Dance Like You're Dumb").

She is a featured vocalist for albums such as Inspiration: A Tribute to Nat King Cole by George Benson, I'll Take Romance by Steve Tyrell, The Last Ai by Ai and That's Life by Landau Eugene Murphy Jr. She has also provided vocals for soundtracks such as Dr. Seuss' The Lorax: Original Songs from the Motion Picture and Happy Feet Two (Soundtrack). 	

A number of Hill's original ballads, including "Desperation" produced by Brian West, were featured in the 2012 Spike Lee film Red Hook Summer which premiered at the 2012 Sundance Film Festival. About Hill, Lee said to Rolling Stone: "She's a phenomenal talent. She can sing with the best of them."

Hill signed a record deal with Sony Music in 2013.

On February 9, 2014, Hill appeared as a back-up singer in the CBS show The Beatles: A Night That Changed America.

Hill was the featured singer on Gerard Way's original song titled "Here Comes the End", released July 8, 2020 and which appears on the second season of The Umbrella Academy.

Michael Jackson
In 2009, Hill was selected as Michael Jackson's duet partner for the This Is It concerts; she practiced for months with Jackson up until his death on June 25, 2009.

Michael Jackson's death caused the concerts to be cancelled. Along with the rest of the This Is It cast members, Hill performed at Jackson's memorial service at the Staples Center in downtown Los Angeles on July 7, 2009. She attracted global attention when she sang the lead on the song "Heal the World" which was one of the climactic moments of the service.

Hill also released a tribute to Jackson, "I Will Always Be Missing You", named after her duet with Jackson "I Just Can't Stop Loving You" in the to-be This Is It concert. It was given as a free download from her website starting late 2009, and was released on iTunes on January 26, 2010 (the same day as the This Is It DVD release) — with all proceeds going to Childhelp US.

The Voice
Hill auditioned for the fourth season of The Voice. In the first episode of the season broadcast on March 25, 2013, she sang "What a Girl Wants" by Christina Aguilera with all four judges, Adam Levine, Shakira, Usher and Blake Shelton pressing their "I Want You" button and turning their chairs. After a hard decision, she chose to join Team Adam. "She's going to be a Grammy-winning superstar, and she's on my team", Levine stated.

For the battle rounds, Hill faced off with Karina Iglesias, singing "It's a Man's Man's Man's World", which along with Amanda Brown and Trevin Hunte's "Vision of Love" and also Jesse Campbell and Anthony Evan's "If I Ain't Got You", was considered one of the best battles in Voice history.  Levine chose her to move on from his team, thus entering the Knockout Rounds. In the Knockout Rounds, Hill was paired against Orlando Dixon and won. Therefore, she entered the top 16, the start of the live shows. She was considered a frontrunner in the competition; however, after her Top 8 performance, she was eliminated on May 28, 2013. She and her teammate Sarah Simmons' eliminations at the Top 8 show was considered one of the most shocking of the season. Said Katy Kroll of Rolling Stone: "It's a sad loss for the show, as Judith had the type of vocal chops and stage presence that should really be rewarded by such a competition."

Performances on The Voice:
 – Studio version of performance reached the top 10 on iTunes

20 Feet from Stardom
Hill and several backup singers are featured in the documentary film 20 Feet from Stardom, which debuted at the 2013 Sundance Film Festival and opened in US theaters on June 14, 2013. The movie won the 2014 Oscar & Critics Choice Award for documentary feature and Hill won a Black Reel Award for Outstanding Original Song for "Desperation". 20 Feet from Stardom also won the 2015 Grammy Award for Best Music Film, with the award being presented to the featured artists as well as the production crew.

Josh Groban
Hill sings backing vocals on three of Josh Groban's songs for the album All That Echoes and was the opening act during the third leg of his All That Echoes World Tour (North America) in Fall 2013.  She also performed two duets with him in his set for "The Prayer" and "Remember When It Rained",<ref name="Funken Berry Review">{{cite web | url=http://www.drfunkenberry.com/2013/10/02/the-voices-judith-hill-signs-with-sony-music-touring-with-josh-grobin/ | title='Dr. FunkenBerry review: "The Voice"'s Judith Hill Signs With Sony Music: Touring With Josh Groban! | website=Drfunkenberry.com | date=October 2, 2013 | access-date=April 23, 2014}}</ref> the latter of which was released as a single.  She appears in Groban's official video for his song "Brave".

John Legend
Judith Hill was the opening act for John Legend on his #AllOfMe Tour in the UK in the autumn of 2014.

Gordon Goodwin's Big Phat Band
Judith Hill is the featured vocalist on her composition "Party Rockers" which appears on Gordon Goodwin's Big Phat Band's album Life in the Bubble.  The song was nominated for a 2015 Grammy Award for Best Arrangement, Instrumental and Vocals.

Prince
On March 22, 2015, Prince invited representatives from several Minnesota media outlets to preview Hill's debut album at Paisley Park. Six selections were played from Back in Time, which Hill recorded in two or three weeks at Paisley Park with Prince as producer. "It's the fastest album I've ever made," he said. Surprisingly, Prince did not discover Hill on The Voice or in the Michael Jackson movie This Is It, where she was featured as a backup singer in rehearsal for his upcoming tour. He learned about her when he saw a video clip of her being interviewed on a Revolt TV show and she mentioned that she'd like to work with Prince.

Discography

Studio albums
 2015: Back in Time 2018: Golden Child 2019: Studio Live Session 
 2021: Baby, I'm Hollywood!Singles
2009: "I Will Always Be Missing You"
2013: "Desperation"
2014: "Remember When It Rained" Duet with Josh Groban
2014: "Party Rockers" on Gordon Goodwin's Big Phat Band's album Life in the Bubble2015: "Cry Cry Cry" from the Back in Time album
2018: "Abracadabra"
2019: "Upside"
2020: "Here Comes the End" with Gerard Way

Soundtracks
2012: Red Hook Summer (Songs from the Original Motion Picture Soundtrack)Filmography

Awards
2014 Black Reel Award – Outstanding Original Song, "Desperation", Twenty Feet from Stardom''
2015 57th Annual Grammy Awards – Grammy Award for Best Music Film
2016 Nominated for NAACP Award Outstanding New Artist

References

Further reading

External links
Judith Hill official website

Interview with Entertainment Tonight – July 9, 2009
Reflections On Media: Judith Hill – The Amazing Singer From The Michael Jackson Memorial & The Voice

Living people
20th-century African-American women singers
American musicians of Japanese descent
Singers from California
Musicians from Los Angeles
Grammy Award winners
Biola University alumni
The Voice (franchise) contestants
21st-century American women singers
1984 births
21st-century American singers
21st-century African-American women singers